The Somerset Buildings Preservation Trust (SBPT) works to save the architectural heritage of Somerset, England.

The Trust is an independent body and consists of up to 18 Trustees who hold Board meetings 3 times a year.  It is a Building Preservation Trust with charitable status and a company limited by guarantee.  The Trust consists of up to 2 elected councillors nominated by the Somerset County Council and 5 elected councillors nominated by the District Councils in Somerset

Projects
Since 1988 the SBPT has restored and converted a number of historic buildings:
 Tudor House, Langport
 Rook Lane Chapel, Frome
 The Temple of Harmony, Halswell Park Estate, Goathurst
 Robin Hood's Hut, Halswell Park Estate, Goathurst
 St Margaret's Almshouses, Taunton
 The Warehouse, Great Bow Yard, Langport
 The Tithe Barn, Dunster

Future projects
The Trust has co-ordinated a £550,000 renovation project to turn the Tithe Barn at Dunster Priory into a community hall.

See also
Building Preservation Trust
Bath Preservation Trust
Society for the Protection of Ancient Buildings
Wiltshire Historic Buildings Trust

Notes

External links 
 Somerset Buildings Preservation Trust

1988 establishments in England
 
Building Preservation Trusts
Charities based in Somerset
Heritage organisations in England
History of Somerset